Qamishli Airport  is an airport serving Qamishli, a city in northeastern Syria.

History
Although the airport was closed to civilians around October 2015, it has been reopened again, and Syrian flight companies including Cham Wings Airlines and Syrian Air now provide regular flights into Qamishli from Damascus, Latakia and Beirut. The airport used to receive seasonal foreign flights from Germany and Sweden. On 21 January 2016, Russia's activity presumably aimed at setting up a new military base in the government-controlled and mainly abandoned airport was first reported.

Facilities

Airlines and destinations

References

External links
 
 

Airports in Syria
Al-Hasakah Governorate
Qamishli